Give My Regards to Broadway is a 1948 American musical film starring Dan Dailey and directed by Lloyd Bacon.

Plot
"Albert the Great" heads up a family juggling act on the vaudeville circuit. Albert Norwick loves the life, entertaining with wife Fay, son Bert and daughters May and June, but vaudeville is a dying form of entertainment and everyone in the family is forced to find normal, everyday jobs.

Although agent Toby Helper continues to look for stage bookings, Albert has become a New Jersey company's shipping clerk. May elopes with boyfriend Frank Doty, reducing the act by one should it ever reunite. June is seeing Arthur Waldron, Jr., whose father owns the firm where she works. Bert, meantime, has a good job and is more interested in playing baseball than in returning to show business.

August Dinkel offers a 16-week booking out west, out of the blue. Albert desperately wants to go, so much so that he goes to the train station alone when everyone else in the family declines. But when he hears a crowd's roar from a nearby baseball field, Albert goes to watch Bert play and realizes he and the entire family are here to stay.

Cast
 Dan Dailey as Bert
 Charles Winninger as Albert
 Nancy Guild as Helen
 Charlie Ruggles as Toby
 Fay Bainter as Fay
 Jane Nigh as May
 Barbara Lawrence as June
 Herbert Anderson as Frank
 Charles Russell as Arthur
 Sig Ruman as August

References

External links
Give My Regards to Broadway at IMDb
Give My Regards to Broadway at TCMDB
Give My Regards to Broadway at British Film Institute

American musical films
1948 films
Films directed by Lloyd Bacon
1948 musical films
20th Century Fox films
1940s American films